John Lahey, AIA, is an American architect who serves as Chairman and a Principal in Charge of Design for Solomon Cordwell Buenz (SCB). He is a leading national and international expert on high-rise residential, transit-oriented development, and innovative design. He's responsible for much of the resurgence in Chicago's downtown residential area as well as transformational projects in Chicago's neighborhoods.

Lahey earned a Bachelor of Architecture from Cornell University. He is affiliated with the Chicago Building Congress, the Economic Club of Chicago, the Urban Land Institute, the Arts Club of Chicago, the American Institute of Architects, Campus Design Review Board - University of Illinois at Chicago, the Board of Trustees - St. Ignatius College Preparatory School, Loyola University Chicago - Council of Regents, Chicago Jesuit Academy Board of Trustees, among other organizations.

Projects
Lahey and his firm have worked on 68 mixed-use high rises in Chicago, with a total of 104 projects in the city.

Recent projects:

 Legacy Tower (Chicago) - a 72-story residential building on Michigan Avenue
 215 W. Wachington (Chicago) - a 35-story LEED certified rental residential green high-rise in the Loop.
 Addison Park on Clark (Chicago) - a sustainable, mixed-use design project.
 Richard J. Klarchek Information Commons at Loyola University Chicago - an all-digital research library.
Easter Seals Metropolitan Chicago Therapeutic School and Center for Autism Research - the first American school designed specifically to meet the needs of students with autism.
 Loyola University Chicago Campus Master Plan
 340 on the Park (Chicago) - a 62-story all-residential tower and the first in the Midwest to achieve LEED silver certification.
The Heritage at Millennium Park (Chicago) - a 57-story mixed-use building that includes  of retail on Wabash Avenue.
 Ann & Robert H. Lurie Children's Hospital of Chicago - Lahey and SCB directed the design architecture for exterior and major public spaces.
 One Rincon Hill (San Francisco) - two residential towers that provide 709 residential units in Rincon Hill. One tower is 55 stories tall, while the other is 47 stories high.
 Three Sixty Residences (San Jose) - a 23-story contemporary building in San Jose's SoFA district.
 The Murano (Philadelphia) - a 42-story high-rise condominium.

 

Other Notable SCB Buildings:

 Sheraton Chicago Hotel
 Crate & Barrel Flagship (Chicago)
 United Terminal 1 Expansion O'Hare International Airport
 Notre Dame Guglielmino Athletics Complex (Indiana)
 Cathedral Palace (Wisconsin)
 Two American Plaza (San Diego)
 Classic Residence by (Hyatt) - Highlands Ranch (Colorado)
 Classic Residence by (Hyatt) - Turtle Creek (Texas)

Notable awards and affiliations

Lahey and SCB are recipients of:

 The LEAF Award for Best Use of Technology 
 The CBC Merit Award and IBS Award for Loyola University's Richard J. Klarchek Information Commons
 The AIA Chicago Distinguished Building Award for Crate & Barrel's store on Michigan Avenue
 The AIA Chicago Distinguished Building Award for Tetra Pak
 Chicago Tribune Architecture Firm of the Year 2000

References

See also
 SCB Architecture
 Tribune Review of Wrigleyville Project
 Coverage of Addison Park Project
 Review of The Legacy

1953 births
Living people
20th-century American architects
People from Queens, New York
21st-century American architects